Jordavi (also Romanized as Jordavī) is a village in Qaleh-ye Bala Rural District, in the Farah Dasht District of Kashmar County, Razavi Khorasan Province, Iran. At the 2006 census, its population was 894, in 207 families.

References 

Populated places in Kashmar County